In soccer, the 1961 Canadian National Challenge Cup, also known as the Dominion Cup, was won by Montreal Concordia (also National League champions).  They beat the Vancouver Firefighters 1-0 in a rain–soaked game in Montreal.

Format 
The eastern Canada based National Soccer League held a round robin series to determine a winner to play against the winner of the Eastern Professional Soccer League.  The winner of that series would then face the western Canada representative.

Squad lists 
The following are some of the players from the games found in the news reports.

Montreal Concordia 
Olivio Lacerda (centre forward)
Hector Dadderio (outside right)
Emilio Svitch (GK)

Vancouver Firfighters 
Ken Pears (GK)
Art Hughes (centre-forward)
Art Bennett (forward)

Matches

References 

Canadian National Challenge Cup
Canadian National Challenge Cup
Nat
Canadian National Challenge